Václav Jamek is a Czech writer and translator. He was born in Kladno on 27 November 1949.

He is also an award-winning writer, noted for both his poetry and prose. He won the Prix Medicis for his 1989 book Traité des courtes merveilles.

He lives in Prague.

References

1949 births
Living people
Czech translators
Prix Médicis essai winners
Czech male writers
20th-century Czech writers
21st-century Czech writers